The Spectre GCR is a hardware and software package for the Atari ST computers. The hardware consists of a cartridge that plugs into the Atari ST's cartridge port and a cable that connects between the cartridge and one of the floppy ports on the ST.  Designed by David Small and sold through his company Gadgets by Small, it allows the Atari ST to run most Macintosh software. It is Small's third Macintosh emulator for the ST, replacing his previous Magic Sac and Spectre 128.

The Spectre GCR requires the owner to provide official Apple Macintosh 128K ROMs and Macintosh Operating System 6.0.8 disks.  This avoids any legal issues of copying Apple's software. The emulator runs best with a high-resolution monochrome monitor, such as Atari's own SM124, but will run on color displays by either displaying a user-selectable half of the Macintosh screen, or missing out alternate lines to fit the lower resolution color display. The Spectre GCR plugs into the cartridge slot and floppy port, and modifies the frequency of the data to/from the single-speed floppy drive of the Atari ST, allowing it to read Macintosh GCR format discs which require a multi-speed floppy drive.

The manual claims the speed to be 20% faster than an actual Mac Plus with a 30% larger screen area and resolution. Although Spectre GCR runs in 1MB of memory, 2MB or more is recommended.

References

External links
Official Spectre Webpage and On-line Resource

Atari ST software
Macintosh platform emulators